The Tennent Caledonian Cup (sponsored by Tennent Caledonian Breweries) was a short-lived preseason football tournament held at Ibrox Park from 1976 to 1979 and contested by teams from England and Scotland.

Results

1976

Southampton beat Manchester City on the toss of a coin.

1977

1978

Southampton beat West Bromwich Albion on penalties.

1979

Kilmarnock beat Brighton & Hove Albion and Rangers on penalties.

Overall

See also
 Anglo-Scottish Cup
 Ibrox International Challenge Trophy

References

Defunct international club association football competitions in Europe
Scottish football friendly trophies
Defunct football cup competitions in Scotland
Rangers F.C.